Helga Mees or Volz-Mees  (12 July 1937 – 11 April 2014) was a German fencer who competed at the 1960, 1964 and 1968 Summer Olympics in the individual and team foil events. She won an individual silver and team bronze in 1964, whereas her teams finished in fourth and fifth place in 1960 and 1968, respectively. She also won two team foil medals at world championships in 1958 and 1959.

References

External links
 

1937 births
2014 deaths
German female fencers
Olympic fencers of the United Team of Germany
Olympic fencers of West Germany
Fencers at the 1960 Summer Olympics
Fencers at the 1964 Summer Olympics
Fencers at the 1968 Summer Olympics
Olympic silver medalists for the United Team of Germany
Olympic bronze medalists for the United Team of Germany
Olympic medalists in fencing
Medalists at the 1964 Summer Olympics
Sportspeople from Saarbrücken